Norman C Deck (1882 – 1980) was a photographer, dentist and missionary.

Career
Deck first learnt photography from his older brother who let him watch as he developed a print, he then developed his knowledge throughout his schooling at Sydney Grammar School. In 1896, at the age of 14 he became the youngest ever member of the Photographic Society of New South Wales. He graduated from Sydney University in 1906 with a Bachelor of Dentistry and began practising in Cowra, New South Wales. During 1909 he returned to Sydney to begin a practice with his brother. In 1905 he won his first gold medal for a photograph entitled "Where Two Paths Meet" '(Five Docks).

Missionary work
Deck's missionary work began in 1914 and spanned the length of two world wars, the total length of his term was 34 years. He made many infrequent returns to Australia during his term in the Solomon Islands. On one trip back to Sydney a disaster occurred in which almost all of his photographs were washed overboard. As part of his work in the Solomons, Deck translated the New Testament into the native dialect from the original language which was Greek. Being 66, 1948 was the year that Deck retired and returned to Sydney to live, there he continued his religious studies.

Photographic style
Deck took many trips overseas, mainly to New Zealand, and he also practiced in the Solomon Islands and developed countless photographs while working as a missionary. Most of Deck's photographs are landscapes and are classified as "beautiful". Many of his earlier prints were destroyed in the tropical climate of the Solomon Islands, after returning to Sydney he reproduced many of his original prints however they took on a different appearance due to certain papers no longer being available. His negatives were donated to the Art Gallery of New South Wales. Deck had quite an eye for good composition, even before the management of his prints.

Exhibitions
Deck started exhibiting around 1903. Records from the State Library of Victoria state that Deck had his first major exhibition at Harrington's in Sydney in 1912; however, a significant fire caused most of his prints from that exhibition to be destroyed.

Records also from the State Library of Victoria indicate that Deck had an exhibition at the Church Street Photographic Centre from 7 September to 8 October 1978. This was a "major exhibition of photographs by Norman Deck which date from 1894, establishes his place in the history of Australian photography." In this particular exhibition there were 40 of Deck's photographs on show. These prints "are a reflection of his career over 84 years". This exhibition took place when Deck was 96 years old. He died two years later at the age of 98.

Gallery

References

http://nla.gov.au/nla.news-article17058231?searchTerm=&searchLimits=

Photographers from New South Wales
1882 births
1980 deaths